The automotive industry in China has been the largest in the world measured by automobile unit production since 2008. Since 2009, annual production of automobiles in China accounted for more than 32% of worldwide vehicle production, exceeding both that of the European Union and that of the United States and Japan combined.

The traditional "Big Four" domestic car manufacturers are SAIC Motor, Dongfeng, FAW and Chang’an. Other Chinese car manufacturers are Geely, Beijing Automotive Group, Brilliance Automotive, BYD, Chery, Guangzhou Automobile Group, Great Wall and Jianghuai (JAC). In addition, several multinational manufacturers have partnerships with domestic manufacturers.

While most of the cars manufactured in China are sold within China, exports – accounting for 11.5% of total production – reached 3.11 million units in 2022, making the country the world's second biggest car exporter. China's home market provides its automakers a solid base and Chinese economic planners hope to build globally competitive auto companies that will become more and more attractive and reliable over the years.

China's automobile industry can be traced back to the early origin of Changan Automobile in 1862. China's automobile industry had mainly Soviet origins (plants and licensed auto design were founded in the 1950s, with the help of the USSR) and had small volumes for the first 30 years of the republic, not exceeding 100–200 thousands per year. Since the early 1990s, it has developed rapidly. China's annual automobile production capacity first exceeded one million in 1992. By 2000, China was producing over two million vehicles. After China's entry into the World Trade Organization (WTO) in 2001, the development of the automobile market accelerated further. Between 2002 and 2007, China's national automobile market grew by an average 21 percent, or one million vehicles year-on-year. In 2009, China produced 13.79 million automobiles, of which 8 million were passenger cars and 3.41 million were commercial vehicles and surpassed the United States as the world's largest automobile producer by volume. In 2010, both sales and production topped 18 million units, with 13.76 million passenger cars delivered, in each case the largest by any nation in history. In 2014, total vehicle production in China reached 23.720 million, accounting for 26% of global automotive production.

The number of registered cars, buses, vans, and trucks on the road in China reached 62 million in 2009. The consultancy McKinsey & Company estimates that China's car market will grow tenfold between 2005 and 2030.
China had about 250 million cars by the end of June 2019, according to the Ministry of Public Security.

The main industry group for the Chinese automotive industry is the China Association of Automobile Manufacturers (中国汽车工业协会).

Manufacturers and brands 

There exists a grouping of traditional “Big Four” state-owned car manufacturers of China, namely: SAIC Motor, FAW, Dongfeng, and Chang’an, with car sales of 5.37 million, 3.50 million, 3.28 million and 2.30 million in 2021 respectively. BAIC frequently challenged Chang'an as the fourth largest automaker but has since fallen behind.

SAIC Motor Corporation (上海汽车集团股份有限公司), also known as SAIC (上汽) and SAIC-GM (上汽通用), is a Chinese state-owned automotive manufacturing company headquartered in Shanghai. The company had the largest production volume of any Chinese automaker in 2017, making more than 6.9 million vehicles.

SAIC sells vehicles under a variety of brands. Brand names that are exclusive to SAIC include Maxus, MG, Roewe, and Yuejin. Products produced by SAIC joint venture companies are sold under marques including Baojun, Buick, Chevrolet, Iveco, Škoda, Volkswagen, and Wuling.

Dongfeng Motor Corporation (东风汽车公司, abbreviated to 东风) is a Chinese state-owned automobile manufacturer headquartered in Wuhan. The company was the second-largest Chinese vehicle maker in 2017, by production volume, manufacturing over 4.1 million vehicles that year. Its own brands are Dongfeng, Venucia and AEOLUS. Joint ventures include Cummins, Dana, Honda, Nissan, Infiniti, Stellantis (through PSA Peugeot Citroën), Renault, Kia and Yulon.

FAW Group Corporation (第一汽车集团, abbreviated to 一汽) is a Chinese state-owned automotive manufacturing company headquartered in Changchun. In 2017, the company ranked third in terms of output making 3.3 million vehicles. FAW sells products under at least ten different brands including its own and Besturn/Bēnténg, Dario, Haima, Hongqi, Jiaxing, Jie Fang, Jilin, Oley, Jie Fang and Yuan Zheng, and Tianjin Xiali. FAW joint ventures sell Audi, General Motors, Mazda, Toyota and Volkswagen.

Chang'an Automobile Group (重庆长安汽车股份有限公司, abbreviated to 长安) is an automobile manufacturer headquartered in Chongqing, and is a state-owned enterprise. In 2017, the company ranked fourth in terms of output making 2.8 million vehicles in 2017. Changan designs, develops, manufactures and sells passenger cars sold under the Changan brand and commercial vehicles sold under the Chana brand. Foreign joint venture companies include Suzuki, Ford, Mazda and PSA Peugeot Citroën.

BAIC Group, also known as Beiqi (abbreviated to 北汽), is a state-owned enterprise and holding company of several Chinese automobile and machine manufacturers located in Beijing. In 2014, the company ranked fifth in terms of output making 2.5 million vehicles. Its principal subsidiaries include the passenger car maker BAIC Motor, the military vehicle and SUV maker BAW and the truck, bus and agricultural equipment maker Foton Motor. BAIC's parent is the Beijing Municipal Government's State-owned Assets Supervision and Administration Commission (SASAC). It has foreign joint ventures with Hyundai and Mercedes-Benz.

Other notable Chinese automotive manufacturers include:

BYD, is an auto manufacturer founded by BYD Company who are known for their batteries and electric buses around the world. They were also the seventh best-selling Chinese car brand in 2017.

GAC (Guangzhou Automobile Group), is a Chinese state-owned automobile manufacturer headquartered in Guangzhou. They were the sixth biggest manufacturer in 2017, manufacturing over 2 million vehicles in 2017. GAC sells passenger cars under the Trumpchi brand. In China, they are more known for their foreign joint-venture with Fiat, Honda, Isuzu, Mitsubishi, and Toyota.

Geely, is the biggest privately owned automobile manufacturer and seventh biggest manufacturer overall in China. Their flagship brand Geely Auto became the top Chinese car brand in 2017. Currently one of the fastest growing automotive groups in the world, Geely is known for its ownership of the Swedish luxury car brand Volvo Cars, its performance counterpart Polestar, and the British sports car company Lotus. In China, their passenger car brands include Geely Auto, Volvo Cars, and Lynk & Co.

Great Wall, the eighth biggest manufacturer in 2017 and the largest manufacturer of SUVs. Great Wall sells vehicles under the brands of Haval and WEY.

Brilliance Auto, is a Chinese state-owned automobile manufacturer based in Shenyang. They were the ninth biggest manufacturer in 2017. They have a foreign joint venture with BMW and also sells passenger vehicles under their own brand Brilliance.

Chery, a Chinese state-owned automobile manufacturer based in Anhui. They were the tenth biggest manufacturer in 2017. They have a foreign joint venture with Jaguar Land Rover for the production of Jaguar and Land Rover cars in China. They also sell cars under the Chery brand and Qoros brand.

Foreign manufacturer joint ventures 

Companies from other countries with joint manufacturing ventures in China include Daimler-Benz, General Motors. The latter makes numerous cars in China in four factories, especially Buick, but also some Chevrolet and Cadillac models, in a 50/50 joint-venture with SAIC Motor, formerly known as Shanghai General Motors Company Ltd. In November 2018, the company announced new Chevrolet models for the Chinese market, including an extended-wheelbase Malibu XL, a new Chevy SUV concept, and a revival of the Monza nameplate.

In 2001, 1.5 million people were employed in this industry in China, and contributed 12 billion U.S. dollars to the economy, which accounts for 5% of the total value added to China's manufacturing industry.

Beijing Benz Automotive Co., Ltd is a joint venture between BAIC Motor and Daimler AG. As of 22 November 2018, a full two million Mercedes-Benz vehicles had been built in China by this alliance. At about the same time, the company announced the final development of a new Mercedes-Benz A-Class L sedan for China, in five variants, to "rival the China-made Audi A3 sedan and the BMW Series 1 sedan". Daimler and another partner, BYD Auto (backed by Warren Buffett), were already manufacturing an electric car for the Chinese market, the Denza, with an improved Denza 500 announced in March 2018. Apparently, Daimler-Benz was also having discussions about making battery-powered Smart cars in China with BYD Auto, according to an August 2018 report; the company would not comment on this topic. At the time, the petrol-powered Smart car was being imported into China.

Honda Motor Co has a joint venture with Guangzhou Automobile Group (GAC Group) and planned to invest 3.27 billion yuan ($469 million) in 2019 in new-energy vehicle manufacturing in China, probably with the Trumpchi badge. Toyota's joint venture is with GAC and the companies planned to build an electric vehicle under the GAC logo. Nissan operates in China under a joint venture with Dongfeng Motor Group Co Ltd. A report in early 2018 indicated that the alliance planned to build a new manufacturing plant in Wuhan, China in addition to expanding the Dongfeng plant in Changzhou to increase capacity. A late August update stated that Nissan and Dongfeng Group planned to invest roughly $900 million to eventually increase the production of Nissan vehicles in China to as many as 2.1 million per year. By September 1, 2018, Nissan's first electric sedan for the Chinese market, the Sylphy Zero Emission, was in production.

VW and Audi cars are manufactured in China by Volkswagen Group China under two joint-venture partnerships: FAW-Volkswagen and SAIC Volkswagen. They have sold 30 million cars as of November 2018. In 2018, the alliance opened three new FAW-Volkswagen plants in China: in Qingdao, Foshan and Tianjin. By 2019, the Audi expected to be making seven new SUV vehicle models in China. An executive with FAW-Volkswagen's Audi division said that two million China-made Audi cars will be sold in the country by 2020. As of the end of 2017, the total to date was 777,000. The joint venture SAIC Volkswagen was also in the process of building an electric-car plant in Anting, near Shanghai by late 2018; it was expected to make 300,000 e-vehicles per year, starting in 2020.

BMW and Chinese partner Brilliance Automotive Group Holdings expected to make 520,000 cars in China during 2019. In October 2018, the German company announced that it will spend €3.6bn ($4.16 billion) to increase ownership of Brilliance Automotive from 50% to 75%. BMW also planned to invest over €3bn to boost manufacturing in China as part of a goal to manufacture more than 650,000 units with Brilliance, starting in the early 2020s. The German company also made an alliance with Great Wall Motor to build electric-powered Mini cars in China for the domestic market.

Jaguar Land Rover operates a joint venture with Chery. A news report in July 2018 suggested that the company was considering increasing their investment to create a new model for China; a late October report about the Jaguar Land Rover turnaround plan, however, did not outline any plan to proceed with this concept.

The entire Volvo Cars company has been owned by the Chinese company Geely since 2010 and manufactures most of the XC60 vehicles in China for export to various countries as well as the local market. Other cars made in China (as of late 2018) for both the local market and for export include the Buick Envision, Ford Focus Active, Volvo S90 and the Cadillac CT-6 plug-in. (Prohibitive tariffs announced by the US in 2018 were expected to significantly reduce auto exports to that country.) Geeley also has investments in Daimler, AB Volvo (the manufacturer of trucks, buses, construction equipment, and engines) and Lotus.

In October 2018, Ford and Baidu announced that they were planning to start testing autonomous vehicles together in Beijing roads by year end, using 
Baidu's "technological know-how and understanding of China together with Ford's vehicle expertise".

History
China's automobile industry can be traced back to the early origin of Changan Automobile in 1862 when Li Hongzhang set up a military supply factory, the Shanghai Foreign Gun Bureau. The first automobile in China was purchased from Hong Kong in 1902 by Yuan Shikai and gifted to Empress Dowager Cixi. It was later put on display in the Summer Palace Museum. During the early twentieth century, major western automobile manufacturers such as the Ford Motor Company, General Motors, and Mercedes-Benz had plants operating in Shanghai.

China's automobile industry had mainly Soviet origins (plants and licensed auto design were founded in the 1950s, with the help of the USSR) and had small volumes for the first 30 years of the republic, not exceeding 100–200 thousands per year. Since the early 1990s, it has developed rapidly. China's annual automobile production capacity first exceeded one million in 1992. By 2000, China was producing over two million vehicles. After China's entry into the World Trade Organization (WTO) in 2001, the development of the automobile market accelerated further. Between 2002 and 2007, China's national automobile market grew by an average 21 percent, or one million vehicles year-on-year. In 2009, China produced 13.79 million automobiles, of which 8 million were passenger cars and 3.41 million were commercial vehicles and surpassed the United States as the world's largest automobile producer by volume. In 2010, both sales and production topped 18 million units, with 13.76 million passenger cars delivered, in each case the largest by any nation in history. In 2014, total vehicle production in China reached 23.720 million, accounting for 26% of global automotive production.

1928 to 1949
The first Chinese built motor vehicle was a truck called the Ming Sheng. It was designed by Daniel F Myers and a prototype was made at the Liao Ning Trench Mortar Arsenal, Shenyang. The prototype was completed on May 31, 1931, for Zhang Xueliang. Prior to production commencing, the factory was bombed by the invading Japanese and production never commenced. A fellow general, Yang Hucheng, patronized the inventor Tang Zhongming to make a new type of automobile engine powered by charcoal. In 1932 Tang founded the Chung Ming Machinery Co. Ltd. in Shanghai to produce the engines. Charcoal powered vehicles were mainly used during the Second Sino-Japanese War in China because of fuel shortages. Tung oil was also used during the war as a petroleum substitute. One source states that Du Yuming designed a car in 1937, but did not make it until 1943 after having been forced to move because of the war. No further information has been found about it.

1949 to 1980

Several vehicle assembly factories were set up in the 1950s and 1960s. They were Beijing (today's Beijing Automotive Industry Holding Corporation),  Shanghai (today's Shanghai Automotive Industry Corporation), Nanjing (later Nanjing Automobile (Group) Corporation, merged with SAIC), and  Jinan (evolving into China National Heavy Duty Truck Group). The Second Automobile Works (later Dongfeng Motor Corporation) was founded in 1968.

The first Chinese production vehicles were trucks made by the First Automobile Works in 1956, called the Jiefang CA-30. This was followed on March 10, 1958, by the 2½ ton light duty truck (NJ130), which was based on the Russian GAZ-51, was produced in Nanjing. The truck was named Yuejin (meaning "leap forward") by China's First Ministry of Industrial Machinery.

In June 1958 the Nanjing Automobile Works, previously a vehicle servicing unit of the Army, was established. Production continued until the last truck (NJ134) rolled off the assembly line on July 9, 1987. Cumulative production was 161,988 units (including models NJ130, NJ230, NJ135 and NJ134). The first production automobiles were the Dongfeng CA71, Hongqi CA72, Feng Huang (later known as the Shanghai SH760) all from 1958.

1980 to 1990

The passenger car industry was a minor part of vehicle production during the first three decades of China's socialist economy. As late as 1985, the country produced a total of only 5,200 cars. To announce that the desire for consumer goods was no longer politically suspect and stimulate personal spending, while also advertising the opening of the Chinese market to foreign producers, a fabricated news story about China's first peasant to own a car was distributed across the world. Sun Guiying, a chicken farmer from near Beijing was touted as having purchased a silver Toyota Publica with her earnings. While the article was largely fraudulent (Mrs. Guiying did not know how to drive, and her husband was a senior official rather than a peasant), the message came across loud and clear. Car sales increased dramatically, although they were almost entirely purchased by danweis (work unitsprivate car ownership was virtually unknown at the time, in spite of the Sun Guiying story).

As domestic production was very limited, import totals rose dramatically, despite a 260 per cent import duty on foreign vehicles. Before 1984, the dominant exporter of cars to China had been the Soviet Union. In 1984, Japan's vehicle exports to China increased sevenfold (from 10,800 to 85,000) and by mid-1985 China had become Japan's second biggest export market after the US. The country spent some $3 billion to import more than 350,000 vehicles (including 106,000 cars and 111,000 trucks) in 1985 alone. Three taxi companies in particular thirsted for Japanese cars, such as Toyota Crowns and Nissan Bluebirds.

As this spending binge began to lead to a severe trade deficit, the Chinese leadership put on the brakes, both through propaganda efforts and by making foreign exchange much less accessible. Customs duties on imported goods were raised in March 1985 and a new "regulatory tax" was added a little later. In September 1985, a two-year moratorium on nearly all vehicle imports was imposed.

While limiting imports, China also tried to increase local production by boosting the various existing joint-venture passenger car production agreements, as well as adding new ones. In 1983, American Motors Corporation (AMC, later acquired by Chrysler Corporation) signed a 20-year contract to produce their Jeep-model vehicles in Beijing. The following year, Germany's Volkswagen signed a 25-year contract to make passenger cars in Shanghai, and France's Peugeot agreed to another passenger car project to make vehicles in the prosperous southern city of Guangzhou. These early joint ventures did not allow the Chinese to borrow much foreign technology, as knock-down kit assembly made up the majority of manufacturing activities; tooling may not have been allowed to slip past borders.

1990 to present
Several enterprises entered the automobile industry since 1994. Some of them are originated from defense industry, such as Chang'an Motors, Changhe, and Hafei Motor; some were developed from old state-owned companies, such as BYD Auto, Brilliance China Auto, Chery Automobile, and Changfeng Automobile. Others are private-owned companies, such as Geely Automobile and Great Wall Motors.

On February 29, 2016, the Ministry of Industry and Information Technology shut down 13 automobile manufacturers that did not meet mandatory production evaluations for two consecutive years.

The number of registered cars, buses, vans, and trucks on the road in China reached 62 million in 2009, with cars accounting for two-thirds of that number, according to the traffic bureau of the Ministry of Public Security. At that time, it was expected to increase to 200 million by 2020. In fact, by March 2017, there were 300.3 million registered vehicles.  A 2018 analysis published by the University of California predicted that up to 419 million vehicles would be registered by 2022 and over 500 million by 2030.

In 2017, the country imported 1.25 million cars according to the China Association of Automobile Manufacturers. Both exports and imports from the US are expected to decline in due to increased tariffs by both the United States and China in July 2018. By value, in 2019, over half of car imports originated from the European Union.

The government is limiting the number of conventionally-powered new cars that are licensed each year, particularly in Beijing where the wait for a license plate in 2018 was roughly five years. Each such plate was priced at US$14,300, an amount that would almost be adequate to buy a small economy car. Licenses for electric vehicles on the other hand, can be obtained quite quickly.

According to research by investment bank Goldman Sachs, newly opened Chinese car plants are the most robotized of such facilities worldwide.

According to China Association of Automobile Manufacturers (C.A.A.M), automakers in China delivered 28,226,616 passenger and light commercial vehicles in 2017. Volkswagen remained the best-selling brand followed by Honda. In 2017, Geely surprised everyone by rocketing to become the third best-selling brand in China and the top Chinese brand in the market. Korean and American brands suffered from lackluster sales with Hyundai dropping from the top ten and GM and Ford both falling below local Chinese brands. Below is a breakdown of the deliveries by brand.

The best selling specific model in 2017 was the Wuling Hong Guang minivan made in partnership with SAIC-GM, formerly known as Shanghai General Motors Company Ltd. In fact, five of the top-15 models were produced by SAIC-GM.  Volkswagen had three models in the top-15, including the number-two Lavida while Geely, Great Wall, and Guangzhou Automotive Corp (GAC) models accounted for several models on that list. Number three of the top-15 belonged to the Nissan Bluebird Sylphy/Sylphy, number four to the Haval H6 and number five to the VW New Santana.

Alternative fuel vehicles 

China encourages the development of clean and fuel efficient vehicles in an effort to sustain continued growth of the country's automobile industry (see Fuel economy in automobiles). By the end of 2007, China plans to reduce the average fuel consumption per 100 km for all types of vehicles by 10%. The proportion of vehicles burning alternate fuel will be increased to help optimize the country's energy consumption. Priority will be given to facilitating the research and development of electric and hybrid vehicles as well as alternate fuel vehicles, especially CNG/LNG. Major cities like Beijing and Shanghai already require Euro-3 emission standards. On March 10, 2008, Beijing became the first city to require light-duty vehicles to meet China-4 emission standard, which was equivalent to Euro-4. Beijing shifted its emission standards to the fifth-stage standards for light-duty and heavy-duty vehicles in January 2013 and August 2015, respectively. On 12 April 2016, the Ministry of Environmental Protection (MEP) released the proposal for light-duty China-6 standard.

Electric vehicles (EV) and Fuel cell vehicles (FCV)

Due to serious air pollution problems and ever-increasing traffic, alternative-energy vehicle production is an area of strong focus for the Chinese government, and several NEV-friendly policies have appeared at the national and local level as a result. In many cities, free licenses — otherwise a significant expenditure for traditional vehicles — are provided for electric vehicle owners, along with exemptions for registry lotteries. These kinds of policies have created strong interest in new energy vehicles within China.

The Chinese Automotive Industry Plan, announced on the main Web site of China's central government, said China aims to create capacity to produce 500,000 new energy vehicles, such as battery electric cars and plug-in hybrid vehicles. The plan aims to increase sales of such new-energy cars to account for about 5% of China's passenger vehicle sales. At the 2010 Beijing Motor Show, more than 20 electric vehicles were on display, most of which came from native automakers. As of May 2010, at least 10 all-electric models have been reported to be on track for volume-production. The first mass-produced plug-in hybrid car (BYD F3DM), all-electric minivan (BYD e6) and all-electric long-range bus (BYD K9) are Chinese.

New energy vehicle sales between January 2011 and March 2016, totaled 502,572 units, of which, over 92% were sold between January 2014 and March 2016. These figures include heavy-duty commercial vehicles such buses and sanitation trucks. These figures only include vehicles manufactured in the country as imports are not subject to government subsidies. , the Chinese stock of plug-in electric vehicles consist of 366,219 all-electric vehicles (72.9%) and 136,353 plug-in hybrids (27.1%).

, China is the world's largest electric bus market, and by 2020, the country was expected to account for more than 50% of the global electric bus market. China also is the world's leader in the plug-in heavy-duty segment, including electric buses, plug-in trucks, particularly sanitation/garbage trucks.

A September 2018 update by CNBC included a prediction that the market share of China's electric vehicles will grow by 40% in the short term and that China expected total annual sales of electric and gasoline-electric hybrid vehicles to be 2 million by 2020. The government was encouraging the purchase of such cars with a short wait time for a new license plate and with government-backed discounts of up to 40% on electric vehicles. In 2018, new-energy vehicles accounted for about 3% of China's new car sales; that was expected to increase to over 30% by 2030 according to an estimate by the Japanese Mizuho Bank.

The country has a significant benefit over others. Some two-thirds of the world's lithium-ion batteries are made in China and the country's EV manufacturing facilities are close to the source these components. In October 2018, Tesla purchased land for the construction of an EV manufacturing plant in Shanghai's Lingang area. By then, VW had already begun construction of its EV factory, with a planned annual capacity of 300,000 SAIC-VW MEB-platform vehicles, starting with three battery-electric vehicles and two plug-in hybrids. Toyota Motor had already launched sales of an EV branded under Guangzhou Automobile Group; the two companies have a joint venture in China.

Sales
In China, authorized car dealership are called 4S car shops. The 4S represents Sales (整車销售 ), Spare parts (零配件), Service (售後服务) and Survey (信息反馈).

In most cases, brand-name new cars can only be purchased from 4S shops. For new cars in high demand, a high premium is added for instant delivery or just placing an order.

The profit of car dealers in China is quite high compared to the rest of the world, in most cases 10%. This is supposedly due to the 'non-transparent invoice price' as announced by manufactures and to the premiums they charge for quick delivery. Due to the lack of knowledge for most customers, dealers can sell add-ons at much higher prices than the aftermarket.

There is no regulation by either the government or associations but some retailers are members of the China Automobile Dealers Association (CADA).

Exports

, exports of Chinese automobiles were about 1 million vehicles per year and rapidly increasing. Most sales were made to emerging economies such as Afghanistan, Algeria, Brazil, Chile, Colombia, Costa Rica, Ecuador, Egypt, Iraq, Iran, Libya, Mexico, North Korea, Peru, the Philippines, Russia, Saudi Arabia, South Africa, or Turkey where a Chinese-made automobile such as a Geely, Great Wall, or Chery sells for about half of what a comparable model manufactured by a multinational brand such as Toyota does. Cars made in China by multinational joint ventures are generally not exported. The quality of Chinese cars is increasing rapidly but, according to J. D. Power and Associates in 2012, it was not expected to reach parity with multinational manufacturers until about 2018.

Most of cars manufactured in China are sold within the country; in 2011,  exports totalled 814,300 units. China's home market provides its automakers a solid base and Chinese economic planners hope to build globally competitive auto companies that will become more and more attractive and reliable over the years. In 2017, the country exported roughly 891,000 vehicles. In that year, the value of exports was nearly $70 billion in auto parts and $14 billion in cars, while total imports (parts and vehicles) totalled about $90 billion.

In 2022, Chinese car exports reached 3.11 million units, ranking second worldwide. Domestic sales still accounted for the bulk of the 27 million units produced. Electric cars sales totaled 679,000.

Controversies
See Allegations of intellectual property theft by China

Copying claims controversy
Several Chinese car makers have been accused of copying designs of other established companies, mainly during 2000s to 2010s. Some BYD models have historically appeared similar to those of other brands including Lexus, Toyota, Honda, Mercedes Benz, and Porsche. GM executives claimed design duplication of the Chery QQ to the Daewoo Matiz, which may extend to interchangeable parts. Jaguar Land Rover regarded Landwind X7 as a copy of the Range Rover Evoque which lead to the lawsuit and Jaguar Land Rover wins the case. German automaker Porsche threatened Zotye with legal action after it revealed the Zotye SR9 in 2016, which is said to resemble the Porsche Macan. The car has been described as a "complete knockoff", with many aspects of the exterior and interior resembling the Macan.

Threats to disclose industry secrets
The Wall Street Journal reported that the government of China will be forcing foreign carmakers to disclose their electric vehicle technology secrets before the vehicles are allowed to be sold in China. The current Chinese automotive policy states that a foreign carmaker must form a joint-venture with a Chinese carmaker if the former plans to sell its electric vehicles there, with the Chinese carmaker owning 51% of the joint venture.

Due to this supposed threat by the Chinese government, Toyota postponed the launch of the current-generation Prius until they learn more about the plan.

According to The New York Times, GM was asked to disclose key technological information on the Volt. Failure to do so would result in not qualifying for substantial (up to $19000) subsidies.

In 2011, China was believed to be behind the theft of information from Renault. In 2013 a US couple was sentenced to jail time for revealing GM trade secrets to Chery.

In 2014 it was noted there are "stringent" and "extreme" requirements for intellectual property transfer in order to sell to the Chinese market. Imported electric vehicles are subject to high taxes and no subsidies.

In 2017, the US government signaled willingness to investigate such forced technology transfers.

See also
Economy of China
 Electric vehicle industry in China
 Motorcycle industry in China
 Military vehicles of China
 Pollution in China
 Renewable electricity
 Renewable energy in China

References

External links

Anderson, Greg, Designated Drivers: How China Plans to Dominate the Global Auto Industry, book talk at the USC U.S.-China Institute, 2012.
China Association of Automobile Manufacturers
Statistical Information Network of China Association of Automobile Manufacturers (in Chinese)
China Society of Automotive Engineering
China Automotive Technology and Research Center
China Council for the Promotion of International Trade Branch of the automotive industry
China National Automotive Industry International
China Corp. 2015 - Auto IndustryDCA Chine-AnalysePublished May, 2015